Sarvarbek Zafarjonov (born 26 July 2000) is an Uzbekistani weightlifter. He won the silver medal in the men's 89kg event at the 2021 World Weightlifting Championships held in Tashkent, Uzbekistan. He won the gold medal in the men's 89kg event at the 2021 Islamic Solidarity Games held in Konya, Turkey.

In 2019, he won the silver medal in the men's 81kg Clean & Jerk event at the 6th International Qatar Cup held in Doha, Qatar.

References

External links 
 

Living people
2000 births
Place of birth missing (living people)
Uzbekistani male weightlifters
World Weightlifting Championships medalists
Islamic Solidarity Games competitors for Uzbekistan
Islamic Solidarity Games medalists in weightlifting
21st-century Uzbekistani people